Santiago River may refer to:

 Santiago River (Ecuador), see Paute River
 Santiago River (Mexico), or Río Grande de Santiago
 Santiago River (Eastern Mexico)
 Santiago River (Peru), in Condorcanqui Province
 Santiago River (Puerto Rico)

See also
 Santiago Rivera (born 1992), Mexican footballer